
Gmina Święciechowa is a rural gmina (administrative district) in Leszno County, Greater Poland Voivodeship, in west-central Poland.

Villages
Gmina Święciechowa contains the villages and settlements of Długie Nowe, Długie Stare, Henrykowo, Krzycko Małe, Książęcy Las, Lasocice, Niechłód, Ogrody, Osada Leśna, Piotrowice, Przybyszewo, Strzyżewice, Święciechowa and Trzebiny.

Neighbouring gminas
Gmina Święciechowa is bordered by the city of Leszno and by the gminas of Góra, Lipno, Rydzyna, Włoszakowice and Wschowa.

References
Polish official population figures 2006

Swieciechowa
Leszno County